The Yamaha XTZ 750 Super Ténéré was a dual-sport motorcycle, produced by Yamaha beginning in 1989. It was named after Yamaha's lighter, single-cylinder models, which in turn were named after the notorious Ténéré desert stage of the former Paris-Dakar Rally in northeastern Niger.

Background
The XTZ 750 is a larger, twin-cylinder version of the single-cylinder Yamaha XTZ 660 Ténéré. The XTZ 660 and XTZ 750 models superseded the smaller, air-cooled Yamaha XT 600Z Ténéré. First sold in 1989, the Super Ténéré used a new Yamaha engine design containing 5-valve heads. A solid protective guard around the engine prevents damage.

The front brake disks of the XTZ are provided with plastic covers. For normal road use these covers are beneficial, but they can make cooling of the brake disks more difficult when riding downhill. Accessories remain common for this model.

The XTZ 750 was discontinued in 1996, but not before the Dakar version YZE750 won the Dakar race twice, plus four more times as an 850.

References

External links

 

XTZ 750
Dual-sport motorcycles
Motorcycles powered by straight-twin engines